Viriato Manuel Pereira de Macedo (born October 16, 1965), also popularly known as Vinny deMacedo, is a Cape Verdean American politician, and was the Massachusetts State Senator for the Plymouth and Barnstable District, which comprises the communities of Bourne, Falmouth, Kingston, Pembroke, Plymouth, and Sandwich. He is a Republican who was sworn into the Massachusetts Senate on January 7, 2015. In November 2019 deMacedo resigned from the Massachusetts Senate to take a job in higher education.

Political career
Senator deMacedo had no political experience prior to becoming a candidate for the Massachusetts House of Representatives on November 3, 1998, running against the Democratic incumbent Joseph Gallitano. He won the election by a tight margin of 189 votes. He subsequently won re-election as Massachusetts State Representative seven times, serving through 2014.

In November 2014, he was elected to the Massachusetts Senate, succeeding retiring Massachusetts Senate President Therese Murray as state senator for the Plymouth and Barnstable District. As of 2016 he held the position of Ranking Minority Member on the Senate Committee on Ways and Means.  His legislative priorities included solving the opiate epidemic facing Massachusetts and ensuring the Commonwealth's fiscal responsibility. Vinny served as one of five state senators (along with 11 state representatives) on the Joint Committee on Marijuana Policy.

During his 16 years in the Massachusetts House, he received many awards for his legislative work including:

 Twice named Legislator of the Year - Massachusetts Town Clerks Association
 Legislator of the Year - Jewish Community Relations Council
 Legislator of the Year – Council of Human Services Providers; and
 National Federation of Independent Business Guardian of Small Business Award.

Biography
Senator deMacedo was born in Brava, Cape Verde. He has six siblings, including an older brother, Donaldo Macedo. In 1966, when he was six months old, the family immigrated to the New England region of the United States, where they lived at first in Dorchester, before three years later moving to Kingston, where deMacedo was raised. He graduated from Silver Lake Regional High School in 1983. He went on to study at  New York's The King's College, from which he graduated with a Bachelor of Arts in Business Administration in 1987.

After graduating deMacedo began working for his brother in the car business before starting his own gas station in Cedarville in 1991. He continues to be the owner and operator of the RWA Mobil Station on Route 3A. He is a member of the Cedarville and Sagamore Business Association and the Plymouth Area Chamber of Commerce.

He is married to Jennifer de Macedo, and is the father of three children.

He visited Cape Verde in January 2008, for the first time since moving to the United States, as part of a political mission, and met several members of the Cape Verdean government, including the President Pedro Pires.

See also
 2019–2020 Massachusetts legislature

References

External links
 official website
 profile at the Commonwealth of Massachusetts official website
 Facebook page
 profile at ImagineElection.com

1965 births
Living people
Republican Party Massachusetts state senators
The King's College (New York City) alumni
People from Plymouth, Massachusetts
American politicians of Cape Verdean descent
Cape Verdean emigrants to the United States
Republican Party members of the Massachusetts House of Representatives
21st-century American politicians
21st-century African-American politicians
20th-century African-American people